The 200s decade ran from January 1, 200, to December 31, 209.

Significant people

References